Brian Marshall (born 20 September 1954 in Bolton on Dearne, West Riding of Yorkshire) is a former professional footballer, who played as a defender for Huddersfield Town and Scunthorpe United.

References 
 99 Years & Counting - Stats & Stories (Huddersfield Town History), A. Hodgson, 3 November 2007.

1954 births
Living people
English footballers
People from Bolton upon Dearne
Association football defenders
English Football League players
Huddersfield Town A.F.C. players
Scunthorpe United F.C. players
Footballers from Yorkshire